The 1972 Tipperary Senior Hurling Championship was the 82nd staging of the Tipperary Senior Hurling Championship since its establishment by the Tipperary County Board in 1887.

Moyne-Templetuohy were the defending champions.

Roscrea won the championship after a 5-08 to 3-06 defeat of Borris-Ileigh  in the final at Semple Stadium. It was their fourth championship title overall and their first title in two years.

References

Tipperary
Tipperary Senior Hurling Championship